"Better Than This" is a song by English singer and songwriter Paloma Faith. It was released on 5 September 2020 by Sony Music as the lead single from her fifth studio album Infinite Things. The song was written by Amanda Cygnaeus, Davide Rossi, Jamie Hartman, Paloma Faith, Richard Zastenker, Salem Al Fakir and Vincent Pontare.

Background
Paloma Faith described the song: "It's love songs for people who are there to stay. That enduring love. Warts and all. I don’t think I've ever heard a love song like that, actually."

Music video
A music video to accompany the release of "Better Than This" was first released onto YouTube on 11 September 2020. The music video was directed by David Wilson. The video was shot in Faith's hometown, Hackney.

Credits and personnel
Credits adapted from Tidal.
 Jamie Hartman – Producer, composer, lyricist, piano
 Jordan Riley – Producer, bass, drums, keyboards, programmer
 Amanda Cygnaeus – Composer, lyricist
 Davide Rossi – Composer, lyricist, strings
 Paloma Faith – Composer, lyricist, associated performer
 Richard Zastenker – Composer, lyricist
 Salem Al Fakir – Composer, lyricist
 Vincent Pontare – Composer, lyricist
 Chris Gehringer – Mastering engineer
 John Hanes – Mixing engineer
 Serban Ghenea – Mixing engineer

Charts

Release history

References

2020 singles
2020 songs
Paloma Faith songs
Songs written by Paloma Faith
Songs written by Vincent Pontare
Songs written by Jordan Riley
Songs written by Salem Al Fakir
Songs written by Jamie Hartman